BestBus (formerly DC2NY) is a company that operates low-cost intercity bus service in the Mid-Atlantic states of the United States. The primary service operated by BestBus runs from various stops in the Washington, D.C. area to New York City. BestBus also operates service on summer weekends from Washington, D.C. and New York City to the Delaware Beaches. BestBus formerly was branding only and service was provided by contractors. BestBus was acquired by charter company DC Trails in 2018 and assumed operations.

Service
BestBus operates low-cost intercity bus service between various locations in the Mid-Atlantic states. There is daily service connecting Washington, D.C. to New York City. Daily service also operates from Manassas, Vienna, and Springfield in Virginia to New York City. On summer weekends, BestBus operates service from Washington, D.C. and New York City to the Delaware Beaches towns of Rehoboth Beach and Dewey Beach.

BestBus offers free Wi-Fi, electric plugs at every seat, free bottled water, and on-board restrooms. All bus riders are guaranteed a seat when boarding.

Stop locations

History
DC2NY was founded by Asi Ohana and Richard Green in 2007 to offer low-cost intercity bus service between Washington, D.C. and New York City. In 2010, DC2NY began summer weekend service from Washington, D.C. to the Delaware Beaches. DC2NY started summer weekend service between New York City and the Delaware Beaches in 2013. In May 2014, the company was renamed to BestBus and added seven new stops. In July 2014, BestBus began service from Manassas, Vienna, and Springfield in Virginia to New York City.

References

External links
Official website

Intercity bus companies of the United States
Bus transportation in Washington, D.C.
Bus transportation in Virginia
Bus transportation in New York (state)
Bus transportation in Delaware
Transport companies established in 2007
Transportation companies based in Washington, D.C.